Usaha Tegas Sdn Bhd is a Malaysian investment holding company led by billionaire Ananda Krishnan. Its principal investments include telecommunications, media, property, and oil & gas companies. Through itself or its subsidiaries, it holds significant interests in the public-listed entities Maxis Berhad, Astro Holdings Sdn Bhd, and Bumi Armada Berhad.

The company was founded in 1984 by Ananda and is headquartered in Kuala Lumpur.

List of investments
Usaha Tegas's investments includes significant shareholdings in various industries.
 Maxis Berhad
 Astro Holdings Sdn Bhd
 Astro Malaysia Holdings Berhad
 Astro Overseas Ltd
 Tanjong PLC
 TGV Cinemas
 Bumi Armada Berhad
 Pexco NV
 MEASAT Satellite Systems
 Sri Lanka Telecom PLC

Notes

References

External links 
Info Wirausaha Ibu Rumah Tangga

1984 establishments in Malaysia
Conglomerate companies of Malaysia
Holding companies of Malaysia
Financial services companies established in 1984
Companies based in Kuala Lumpur
Privately held companies of Malaysia